Under that Christmas Spell is the third EP by American singer-songwriter Tim Halperin, released in November 2012. Beyond the original title track, songs include older covers such as "Maybe This Christmas."

Production
Halperin has stated he was inspired to make the EP while made nostalgic by a red Starbucks cup in the middle of a Texas summer. According to Halperin, "Growing up, I worked on a Christmas tree farm for four years. Around Christmas, people in general are more happy and forgiving."

Release
In November 2012 Tim Halperin released the EP Under that Christmas Spell, which includes five arrangements of classic songs and the eponymous single written by Halperin. The album's final cover, "I'll Be Home for Christmas," features Hayley Orrantia on vocals.

Reception
According to a review, "Under That Christmas Spell is a six-song album that intermixes original tunes and classic covers.  Halperin reinvented the hymn-like 'Mary Did You Know' by adding cello and redirecting the listener to the lyricism of the song. In his rendition of 'Have Yourself a Merry Little Christmas,' Halperin's sincerity bleeds through as his voice dances over minimalist guitar lines and dainty xylophone."

Track listing

References

External links
Tim Halperin on Facebook (Official)

2012 Christmas albums
Christmas albums by American artists
Pop Christmas albums
Tim Halperin albums
24 Hour Distribution albums